The 1982 Prix de l'Arc de Triomphe was a horse race held at Longchamp on Sunday 3 October 1982. It was the 61st running of the Prix de l'Arc de Triomphe.

The winner was Akiyda, a three-year-old filly trained in France by François Mathet. The winning jockey was Yves Saint-Martin who was winning the race for the third time. The filly won by a neck from the British-trained six-year-old Ardross

The winning time was 2m 37.0s.

Race details
 Sponsor: Trusthouse Forte
 Purse: 
 Going: Soft
 Distance: 2,400 metres
 Number of runners: 17
 Winner's time: 2m 37.0s

Full result

* Abbreviations: shd = short-head; nk = neck

Winner's details
Further details of the winner, Akiyda.
 Sex: Filly
 Foaled: 21 April 1979
 Country: United Kingdom
 Sire: Labus; Dam: Licata (Abdos)
 Owner: Aga Khan IV
 Breeder: Marcel Boussac

References

Prix de l'Arc de Triomphe
 1982
Prix de l'Arc de Triomphe
Prix de l'Arc de Triomphe
Prix de l'Arc de Triomphe